Amsterdam is a live album by the rock band Phish. It contains three complete concerts on eight CDs.
It was recorded on February 17, 1997, and July 1 and 2, 1997, at the Paradiso in Amsterdam, Netherlands. Packaged as a box set, it was released by JEMP Records on June 16, 2015.

Track listing
Disc one
February 17, 1997 – first set:
"Soul Shakedown Party" (Marley) – 4:49
"Divided Sky" (Anastasio) – 13:32
"Wilson" (Anastasio, Marshall, Woolf) – 4:44
"My Soul" (Chenier) – 5:13
"Guyute" (Anastasio, Marshall) – 10:13
"Timber" (White) – 7:05
"Billy Breathes" (Anastasio) – 6:56
"Llama" (Anastasio) – 4:02
"Bathtub Gin" (Anastasio, Goodman) – 13:03
"Golgi Apparatus" (Anastasio, Marshall, Szuter, Woolf) – 4:57

Disc two
February 17, 1997 – second set:
"The Squirming Coil" (Anastasio, Marshall) – 10:17
"Down with Disease" (Anastasio, Marshall) – 18:18
"Carini" (Anastasio, Fishman, Gordon, McConnell) – 21:26
"Taste" (Anastasio, Fishman, Gordon, Marshall, McConnell) – 6:34
"Down with Disease" (Anastasio, Marshall) – 1:24
"Suzy Greenberg" (Anastasio, Pollak) – 6:19
"Prince Caspian" (Anastasio, Marshall) – 8:17

Disc three
February 17, 1997 – encore:
"Sleeping Monkey" (Anastasio, Marshall) – 5:56
"Rocky Top" (Bryant, Bryant) – 3:01
July 1, 1997 – first set:
"Ghost" (Anastasio, Marshall) – 22:26
"Horn" (Anastasio, Marshall) – 4:06
"Ya Mar" (Ferguson) – 10:00

Disc four
July 1, 1997 – first set (cont.):
"Limb by Limb" (Anastasio, Herman, Marshall) – 12:43
"Ain’t Love Funny" (Cale) – 4:44
"Saw It Again" (Anastasio, Marshall) – 7:08
"Dirt" (Anastasio, Herman, Marshall) – 4:29
"Reba" (Anastasio) – 17:21
"Dogs Stole Things" (Anastasio, Marshall) – 5:25

Disc five
July 1, 1997 – second set:
"Fish Keyboard Jam" (Anastasio, Fishman, Gordon, McConnell) – 3:18
"Timber" (White) – 8:16
"Bathtub Gin" (Anastasio, Goodman) – 14:32
"Cities" (Byrne) – 24:37
"Loving Cup" (Jagger, Richards) – 6:07
"Slave to the Traffic Light" (Abrahams, Anastasio, Pollak) – 12:29
July 1, 1997 – encore:
"When the Circus Comes" (Hidalgo, Pérez) – 5:27

Disc six
July 2, 1997 – first set:
"Mike's Song" (Gordon) – 10:15
"Simple" (Gordon) – 12:03
"Maze" (Anastasio, Marshall) – 13:49
"Strange Design" (Anastasio, Marshall) – 3:21
"Ginseng Sullivan" (Blake) – 3:25
"Vultures" (Anastasio, Herman, Marshall) – 6:18
"Water in the Sky" (Anastasio, Marshall) – 2:47
"Weekapaug Groove" (Anastasio, Fishman, Gordon, McConnell) – 13:39

Disc seven
July 2, 1997 – second set:
"Stash" (Anastasio, Marshall) – 30:47
"Llama" (Anastasio) – 5:39
"Wormtown Jam" (Anastasio, Fishman, Gordon, McConnell) – 7:15
"Wading in the Velvet Sea" (Anastasio, Marshall) – 8:15

Disc eight
July 2, 1997 – encore:
"Free" (Anastasio, Marshall) – 12:45
"David Bowie" (Anastasio) – 16:11

Personnel
Phish
Trey Anastasio – guitar, lead vocals, co-lead vocals on "Taste"
Page McConnell – keyboards, backing vocals, lead vocals on "Strange Design" and "Wading in the Velvet Sea"
Mike Gordon – bass, backing vocals, lead vocals on "Rocky Top", "Ya Mar", "Ain't Love Funny", "Mike's Song" and "Ginseng Sullivan"
Jon Fishman – drums, backing vocals, co-lead vocals on "Taste", keyboards on "Fish Keyboard Jam"
Production
Produced by Phish

References

Phish live albums
2015 live albums